Hedwig and the Angry Inch is a 1998 musical about a fictional rock and roll band of the same name fronted by an East German transgender woman, with a book by John Cameron Mitchell (who also played the title role in the original production and film), and music and lyrics by Stephen Trask. The musical has gathered a devoted cult following, and was adapted into the 2001 American musical film of the same name directed by Mitchell.

The cast recording was released in 1999 on Atlantic Records, featuring the original cast (John Cameron Mitchell, Stephen Trask, Miriam Shor, Scott Bilbrey, David McKinley, and Chris ) performing all the tracks written for the stage musical. Hedwig's songs were also recorded for the 2001 film soundtrack by John Cameron Mitchell (lead vocals), Stephen Trask, Miriam Shor, Bob Mould (formerly of Hüsker Dü), Ted Liscinski, Perry L. James, Alexis Fleisig, and Eli Janney. Tommy Gnosis' songs were recorded by Stephen Trask (lead vocals), Miriam Shor, Bob Mould, Ted Liscinski, Perry L. James, Scott McCloud, Eli Janney, Alexis Fleisig, and Johnny Temple.

Track listings
Off-Broadway soundtrack
 "Tear Me Down"
 "The Origin of Love"
 "Random Number Generation" †
 "Sugar Daddy"
 "Angry Inch"
 "Wig in a Box"
 "Wicked Little Town"
 "The Long Grift"
 "Hedwig's Lament"
 "Exquisite Corpse"
 "Wicked Little Town (Reprise)"
 "Midnight Radio"

Film soundtrack
(This Soundtrack is not in Film-Performance Order)

 "Tear Me Down"
 "Origin of Love"
 "Angry Inch"
 "Wicked Little Town" (Tommy Gnosis Version) ‡
 "Wig in a Box"
 "The Long Grift"
 "Hedwig's Lament"
 "Exquisite Corpse"
 "Midnight Radio"
 "Nailed" †
 "Sugar Daddy"
 "Freaks" †
 "In Your Arms Tonight" †
 "Wicked Little Town" (Hedwig Version) ‡

Broadway revival soundtrack
 "America the Beautiful"	៛
 "Tear Me Down"
 "The Origin of Love"
 "Deutschlandlied" §
 "Sugar Daddy"
 "When Love Explodes (Love Theme from Hurt Locker: The Musical)"
 "Angry Inch"
 "Wig in a Box"
 "Wicked Little Town"
 "The Long Grift"
 "Hedwig's Lament"
 "Exquisite Corpse"
 "Wicked Little Town (Reprise)"
 "Midnight Radio"

 † = Not a part of the show's score.
 ‡ = Also known as "Wicked Little Town" and "Wicked Little Town (Reprise)"
 ៛ = Usually included as an intro to "Tear Me Down" but here is an individual track.
 § = Usually included as an intro to "Sugar Daddy" but here is an individual track.

Songs
Most of these songs were covered by major artists on the charity album Wig in a Box.

Tear Me Down
"Tear Me Down" is a song from the off-Broadway musical Hedwig and the Angry Inch and subsequent film. It was composed by Stephen Trask, and performed by the characters Hedwig (John Cameron Mitchell) and Yitzhak (Miriam Shor). It is the show's opening number. It contains a spoken section alluding to the construction of the Berlin Wall on August 13, 1961 and its fall on November 9, 1989.

Meaning
Tear Me Down introduces Hedwig as a person who has been, just like her home town of Berlin, "split in two". Most obviously she is part-male and part-female, but as the song progresses, we see that she is also a cross between conqueror and victim ("Enemies and adversaries, they try and tear me down"); spirituality and repugnance ("I rose ... like Lazarus" and "decorate/degrade me with blood, graffiti and spit"); accessibility and imprisonment ("Ain't much of a difference between a bridge and a wall").

Notably, Hedwig is compared to the divide between Communist East Germany and capitalist West Germany. Her personal crisis stems from the disparity between these two states and her inability to reconcile them, much as she cannot reconcile her new body ("I rose from off the doctor's slab").

Other versions
The song was covered by the rock artist Meat Loaf on his 2003 album Couldn't Have Said It Better, adapting some of the lyrics (notably the spoken section about the Berlin Wall) so that the song is instead about Texas and Meat Loaf's own life. (Trask, who composed the music for Hedwig, was much influenced by Meat Loaf's albums when he was growing up. A deleted scene on the Hedwig DVD acknowledges the debt in a roundabout way, as we overhear Hedwig's manager Phyllis Stein (Andrea Martin) arguing about the band's sound on the phone: "MEAT LOAF..?! Bowie!")
In the same year,  the band Spoon covered the song, with Stephen Colbert reciting the spoken part originally performed by Miriam Shor, for a charity tribute album called Wig in a Box, released by Off Records.

Sugar Daddy
"Sugar Daddy" is a song from the off-Broadway musical Hedwig and the Angry Inch and subsequent film. It was composed by Stephen Trask, and is performed in the musical by the characters Hedwig (John Cameron Mitchell) and Sgt. Luther Robinson (Maurice Dean Wint in the film).

The divide between Communist East Germany and the democratic Western World is illustrated in the numerous cultural references included in the song's lyrics; they underline the idea that Hedwig is living in the Communist world where dictators and violence are the norm, while across the wall, Luther (and the American food products, fashion items and technological advancements) represents the American Dream.

The song was performed by Neil Patrick Harris at the 2014 Tony Awards.

Covers

 Frank Black (Engineered by Joel Hamilton, Produced by Reid Paley, who also appears on guitar) on the charity tribute album Wig in a Box: Songs from & Inspired by Hedwig and the Angry Inch

Angry Inch
"The Angry Inch" is a song from the off-Broadway musical, Hedwig and the Angry Inch and its subsequent film adaptation. It was composed by Stephen Trask and performed by John Cameron Mitchell. The song details the botched sex-change operation that Hedwig got in order to marry an American soldier and move to the United States. The eponymous "angry inch" is what remains of Hedwig's penis — "six inches forward and five inches back".

The song was covered by Type O Negative on the album Life is Killing Me. Sleater-Kinney and Fred Schneider also covered the song for Wig in a Box, a benefit album for the Hetrick-Martin Institute. Production of the album was documented in the 2006 film Follow My Voice: With the Music of Hedwig.

In the film, the song was performed at the fictional Bilgewater's and the song started a fight.

Wig in a Box
"Wig in a Box" is a song from the off-Broadway musical, Hedwig and the Angry Inch and its subsequent film adaptation. It was composed by Stephen Trask and is performed in the musical by the character Hedwig (John Cameron Mitchell) and her band The Angry Inch.

The titular wig in the box is the last present that Hedwig's husband Luther bought her, and the song concerns Hedwig listening to music and trying on wigs, which enables her to escape her present troubles and become whomever she wants. The part of the story in which this song appears is set in 1989, but the song contains references to sound recording (and playing) devices already outdated in 1989; they reflect the time period of each wig style and the character Hedwig assigns to it ("Miss Farah Fawcett on TV," "Miss Beehive 1963,").

Covers

 The Polyphonic Spree on the charity tribute album Wig in a Box: Songs from & Inspired by Hedwig and the Angry Inch

The Origin of Love
"The Origin of Love" is a song from the stage show Hedwig and the Angry Inch and subsequent film.  Stephen Trask wrote the song, which is based on a story from Plato's Symposium.

Origins
In the Symposium, a party is being held in which a series of speeches are given paying homage to Eros, the Greek god of love.  "The Origin of Love" is taken from the speech given by the playwright Aristophanes.

According to the speech, long ago, humans were composed of two people stuck back-to-back, with two faces and eight limbs. Male-male humans came from the Sun, female-female humans from the Earth and male-female humans from the Moon. The gods, out of jealousy, split them in half. Now, throughout our lives, we are always trying to find our "other half", and sexual intercourse is the only means we have to put the two halves back together; this desire to be one person again is what we call "love". However, it is impossible to fully rejoin two people because it is our souls and not our bodies that most desire to be reunited.

The song
Trask says of the song's form: "When I started writing that song, the only way I could think to write it was as a picture book. So I wrote it, all the images in it, and the way the story gets told, as the language of, like, a Dr. Seuss picture book. If you read the lyrics out loud, they read like a picture book."

While taken from the story within the story in the Symposium, the song deliberately jumbles deities of different cultures (such as Zeus, Osiris, and Thor.) It puts forward Hedwig's idea that humans have pre-destined soul mates, and that she is seeking hers. At the end of the film, Tommy addresses this idea in the reprise of the song Wicked Little Town, arguing that no cosmic force controls our destiny ("And there's no mystical design, no cosmic lover preassigned"), and suggesting that she needs to move on.

According to the Internet Movie Database, and the DVD's commentary track, the vocals for this song as it appears in the film were recorded live.

The animation that accompanies the song in the film version was drawn by Emily Hubley.

Covers
On the album Wig in a Box (a charity cover of the Hedwig soundtrack), "The Origin of Love" is covered separately by Rufus Wainwright and Jonathan Richman.
Bonnie Pink included a version on her cover album Reminiscence

Wicked Little Town
"Wicked Little Town" is a song from the off-Broadway musical, Hedwig and the Angry Inch and the subsequent film adaptation. Composed by Stephen Trask, the song is a poetic reflection on the doomed love between two of the characters, Hedwig and Tommy Gnosis.

Summary and context
The original song is basically about a person who falls in love with someone in a wicked town that seems to be impossible to escape. In the story of Hedwig and the Angry Inch, Hedwig sings the tune as a love song to Tommy, while in the film, she is singing a version of the song when Tommy comes into a donut shop, and later in the film, a full, rock ballad reprise version has been created for Tommy to sing to Hedwig. After his relationship with Hedwig was revealed, Tommy sings that he is sorry for how much he has hurt Hedwig, that he never understood she was "more than a woman or a man" and that now he finally sees how much he took from her by stealing her songs. He also tells her that her ideas about soulmates and cosmic destiny are preventing her from moving on ("Maybe there's nothing up in the sky but air...") and then, wishing her well, he slips away into the darkness, leaving Hedwig in tears.

It is notable that a line in the song, "If you've got no other choice, you know you can follow my voice" is literally played out in the story, as Hedwig stalks Tommy around the country from concert to concert, "following his voice."  It could also be said that Tommy followed Hedwig's voice, given his hero worship of her, his taking on of the Tommy Gnosis persona she devised, and his theft of her songs.  When Tommy sings the reprise, he stops singing at "voice" while the song continues to play, and Hedwig smiles in a reaction shot.

Covers
The Tommy Gnosis Version
Ben Jelen on his album Give It All Away
The Bens on the charity tribute album Wig in a Box: Songs from & Inspired by Hedwig and the Angry Inch
Bright Light Bright Light on his EP Cinematography
The Hedwig Version
The Breeders on the charity tribute album Wig in a Box: Songs from & Inspired by Hedwig and the Angry Inch
Soft Charisma on the album Life Inside The Robot Man

The Long Grift
"The Long Grift" is a song from the off-Broadway musical, Hedwig and the Angry Inch and its subsequent film adaptation. It was composed and by Stephen Trask.

In the film version, the song was cut (except for the part where Tommy is working on the line "Look what you've done." In the stage version, the song is sung by Hedwig's husband Yitzhak, when Hedwig becomes overwhelmed with emotion and is unable to perform the song.  The lyrics accuse Hedwig's former lover (Tommy Gnosis) of grifting her, singing: "I didn't want to know  that your cool, seductive serenade // Is a tool of your trade, you gigolo."  Hedwig concludes by deprecating the entirety of their love, singing "The love that had me in your grip // was just a long, long grift."

Covers

 They Might Be Giants on the charity tribute album Wig in a Box: Songs from & Inspired by Hedwig and the Angry Inch

Midnight Radio
"Midnight Radio" is a song from the off-Broadway musical, Hedwig and the Angry Inch and its subsequent film adaptation.  It was composed by Stephen Trask and performed by John Cameron Mitchell in both the original off-Broadway play and the 2001 feature film.

The song contains a number of references to the inspiring women of rock 'n roll, including Aretha Franklin, Yoko Ono, Nico, Patti Smith, Tina Turner, and Nona Hendryx.

Covers
"Midnight Radio" was covered by Cyndi Lauper and Minus 5 (featuring Peter Buck of REM) on the 2003 charity album Wig in a Box.
"Midnight Radio" was covered by Dar Williams on her 2008 release, Promised Land.

References

1999 soundtrack albums
Cast recordings
Theatre soundtracks
Hedwig and the Angry Inch
Albums produced by Brad Wood
Transgender-related music